Femmes d'Aujourd'hui (French: Women of Today) is a French-language weekly women's magazine published in Mechelen, Belgium. Founded in 1933, it is one of the oldest magazines in the country and the first Belgian women's magazine.

History and profile
Femmes d’Aujourd’hui was first published on 1 April 1933, being the first Belgian women's magazine. Sanoma is the owner of the magazine. The magazine is published by Sanoma Magazines Belgium on a weekly basis and has its headquarters in Mechelen. The weekly was formerly based in Brussels. The magazine is also distributed in France, which started in the 1950s.

Femmes d’Aujourd’hui covers various sections for fashion, beauty, health, decoration, tourism, gardening and psychology. After 1960 the weekly began to include romance photos and graphic fiction. At the beginning of the 1970s it featured graphic editions of classical novels such as Jane Austen's Pride and Prejudice. Between 1952 and 1991 the magazine also published the comics by several caricaturists on three pages per week, including Edmond Calvo, Henri Vernes and William Vance.

Annick Poncelet was the editor-in-chief of the magazine whose tenure ended in January 2003 when she resigned from the post. Anouk Van Gestel also served as the editor-in-chief of the weekly, of which the editor-in-chief was Anne Daix in 2015.

The magazine celebrated its 80th anniversary with a special edition published on 28 March 2013.

Circulation
In 1961 Femmes d’Aujourd’hui had a circulation of 1,122,000 copies in France, and nearly 200,000 copies in Belgium. During the period of 2006-2007 it was the third best-selling women's magazine in Belgium with a circulation of 130,000 copies. The circulation of the magazine was 100,038 copies in 2010 and 95,621 copies in 2011. It fell to 93,516 copies in 2012 and to 92,873 copies in 2013. Between July 2013 and June 2014 the circulation of the magazine was 86,434 copies. It sold 84,596 copies in 2014.

See also
 List of magazines in Belgium

References

External links
 

1933 establishments in Belgium
French-language magazines
Magazines established in 1933
Magazines published in Brussels
Mass media in Mechelen
Weekly magazines published in Belgium
Women's magazines published in Belgium